Chertsey is a municipality in the regional county municipality of Matawinie in Quebec, Canada, located in the administrative region of Lanaudière.

The diocesan shrine Mary Queen of Hearts (Marie-Reine-des-Coeurs) is in Chertsey.

Lake Beaulac, the lake with the highest elevation in Lanaudière, was annexed by the municipality in 1991.

Demographics

Population

Private dwellings occupied by usual residents: 2,720 (total dwellings: 4,255)

Language
Mother tongue:
 English as first language: 3.1%
 French as first language: 92.6%
 English and French as first language: 1.8%
 Other as first language: 2.2%

Education

Commission scolaire des Samares operates Francophone public schools:
 École de Saint-Théodore-de-Chertsey

Sir Wilfrid Laurier School Board operates Anglophone public schools:
 Rawdon Elementary School in Rawdon
 Joliette High School in Joliette

See also
List of municipalities in Quebec

References

External links 
 
  Municipalité de Chertsey

Municipalities in Quebec
Incorporated places in Lanaudière
Matawinie Regional County Municipality